Shaler Area School District is a large, suburban public school district located in Allegheny County, Pennsylvania. According to 2000 federal census data, it served a resident population of 41,565. By 2010, the district's population declined to 39,293 people. In 2009, Shaler Area School District residents’ per capita income was $21,333, while the median family income was $52,135. In the Commonwealth, the median family income was $49,501 and the United States median family income was $49,445, in 2010. By 2013, the median household income in the United States rose to $52,100.

Schools
There are Seven schools in the Shaler Area School District. The schools in order from lowest grade levels to highest are:

Burchfield Primary (K - 3rd Grade)
Jefferey Primary (K - 3rd Grade) Closed in 2018
Marzolf Primary (K - 3rd Grade)
Reserve Primary (K - 3rd Grade)
Scott (Formerly Rogers) Primary (K - 3rd Grade) 
Shaler Area Elementary School(4th - 6th Grade)
Shaler Area Middle School (7th and 8th Grade)
Shaler Area High School (9th - 12th Grade)

Extracurriculars
The Shaler Area School District offers a variety of clubs, activities and an extensive sports program. The District has both a marching band and an orchestra.

Sports
The District funds:

Boys
Baseball - AAAA
Basketball V/JV- AAAA
Bowling - AAAA
Cross Country - AAA
Football - AAAA
Golf - AAAA
Indoor Track and Field - AAAA
Ice Hockey
Lacrosse - AAAA
Soccer - AAA
Swimming and Diving - AAA
Tennis - AAA
Track and Field - AAA
Volleyball - AAA
Wrestling - AAA

Girls
Basketball - AAAA
Bowling - AAAA
Cheer - AAAA
Cross Country - AAA
Golf - AAA
Indoor Track and Field AAA
Lacrosse - AAAA
Soccer (Fall) - AAA
Softball - AAAA
Swimming and Diving - AAA
Girls' Tennis - AAA
Track and Field - AAA
Volleyball - AAA

According to PIAA directory July 2013.

Shaler's teams are all nicknamed "The Titans." Shaler athletics compete in the WPIAL/PIAA AAAA/AAA divisions depending on sport.

Shaler's biggest rival is the neighboring North Allegheny Tigers and North Hills Indians, who also compete in the same section.

Shaler's softball team took home numerous PIAA and WPIAL titles from 2000-2009.

Neighboring Districts
Shaler Area School District neighbors are: North Hills S.D. to the west, Hampton Township S.D. to the north, Fox Chapel Area S.D. to the east, and the Pittsburgh S.D. to the south.

References

External links
Shaler Area School District website

School districts in Allegheny County, Pennsylvania
Education in Pittsburgh area